Vladimir Aleksandrovich Frolov (born 31 October 1982) is a former Russian professional football player.

Club career
He played two seasons in the Russian Football National League for FC Dynamo Makhachkala and FC Spartak-MZhK Ryazan.

References

1982 births
Living people
Russian footballers
Association football midfielders
FC Sakhalin Yuzhno-Sakhalinsk players
FC Sever Murmansk players
FC Spartak-MZhK Ryazan players
FC Dynamo Makhachkala players